Cornelia Stuyvesant Vanderbilt Cecil Bulkely-Johnson Goodsir (August 22, 1900 – February 7, 1976) was an American born heiress and member of the Vanderbilt family who inherited the Biltmore Estate. She was known for her eccentric behavior.

Early life

Cornelia was born at the Biltmore Estate in North Carolina on August 22, 1900. She was the daughter, and only child, of George Washington Vanderbilt II (1862–1914) and Edith Stuyvesant Dresser (1873–1958). Her father, the youngest child of William Henry Vanderbilt and Maria Louisa (née Kissam) Vanderbilt, built a 250-room mansion, the largest privately owned home in the United States, which he named Biltmore Estate. The estate, designed by architect Richard Morris Hunt, was modeled on the Chateau de Blois among other chateaux of the Loire Valley. She was the great-granddaughter of Commodore Cornelius Vanderbilt, and, on her mother’s side, she was a descendant of Peter Stuyvesant.

After her father's death in 1914, Cornelia inherited the Biltmore estate. Her mother later married Peter Goelet Gerry (1879–1957), a United States senator from Rhode Island.

Cornelia attended the Madeira School for high school. She was privately tutored and attended the University of North Carolina for approximately a year. When she reached 21 years old, she received an annuity of $2,000,000 and at the age of 25, she received her full inheritance of $50,000,000 from her father.

Personal life
On April 29, 1924, Cornelia was married to a British aristocrat who was then the first secretary of the British Embassy in Washington, Hon. John Francis Amherst Cecil (1890–1954), the son of Lord William Cecil and Mary Cecil, Baroness Amherst of Hackney. The Cecils were descendants of William Cecil. The nationally renowned organist from St. Louis Charles Henry Galloway played organ at the wedding. They divorced in 1934.

Cornelia Vanderbilt and Cecil were the parents of two sons:

 George Henry Vanderbilt Cecil (1925–2020), who married Nancy Owen (1930–2016).
 William Amherst Vanderbilt Cecil (1928–2017), who married Mary Lee Ryan (1931–2017), a first cousin of First Lady Jackie Kennedy, as their mothers, Janet Norton Lee and Marion Merritt Lee, were sisters.

Around 1932, reportedly finding life at Biltmore too dull, she moved to New York City to briefly study art, leaving her husband to manage Biltmore. A few months later, she moved to Paris where she divorced her husband in 1934, dyed her hair bright pink, and changed her name to Nilcha. After her 1934 move abroad, she never returned to Biltmore or the United States again. After Paris, she moved to London, where she met and married Captain Vivian Francis Bulkeley-Johnson (1891–1968) in October 1949. Bulkeley-Johnson, the aide-de-camp to the 9th Duke of Devonshire when he was the Governor General of Canada from 1916 to 1918, served in the offices of the Imperial War Cabinet in World War I and in the Air Ministry. They remained married until his death in 1968.

One evening as she was having dinner with Edward Adamson in London, Cornelia met William Robert "Bill" Goodsir, their waiter with whom she fell in love. In 1972, Cornelia married for the third and final time to Goodsir (1926–1984), who was 26 years younger than she was. She was a friend and supporter of Adamson, the pioneer of Art Therapy, and tried unsuccessfully to fund his post at Netherne Hospital, and the Adamson Collection through her Mrs Smith Trust (correspondence in Edward Adamson Archive at the Wellcome Library). 

Cornelia died on February 7, 1976, aged 75, in Oxford, England. Her ashes were buried at a church near her home, The Mount, a farm in the village of Churchill in Oxfordshire, near Kingham.

Legacy

Vanderbilt's sons eventually inherited the Biltmore estate, with George Cecil, the older of the two sons, choosing to inherit the majority of the estate's land and the Biltmore Farms Company, which was more profitable than the house at the time. The younger son, William Cecil, was thus left with Biltmore House. He is credited with preserving the chateau, which is open to the public (although still privately owned). Through George, Vanderbilt was the grandmother of six, and through William, she was the grandmother of two more.

References

Further reading
Vanderbilt, Arthur T. II. (1989) Fortune's Children: The Fall of the House of Vanderbilt New York: Quill / William Morrow. . p. 40 (the death of G. W. Vanderbilt 1), pp. 55–83 (William H. Vanderbilt), pp. 271–279 (Cornelia Stuyvesant Vanderbilt).

External links

1919 Photograph of Cornelia Stuyvesant Vanderbilt at the Library of Congress
Article on her 1924 Wedding

1900 births
1976 deaths
American people of Dutch descent
Cornelia Stuyvesant Vanderbilt
Madeira School alumni
People from Asheville, North Carolina
People from New York City
Cornelia Stuyvesant Vanderbilt
Cornelia Stuyvesant Vanderbilt